The qualification competition for the 2004 FIFA Futsal World Championship was a series of tournaments organised by the six FIFA confederations. Each confederation — the AFC (Asia), CAF (Africa), CONCACAF (North, Central America and Caribbean), CONMEBOL (South America), OFC (Oceania), and UEFA (Europe) — was allocated a certain number of the 16 places at the tournament.

Qualification process

Africa (CAF)

Final

                        
|}

Asia (AFC)

Knockout stage

|-style="background-color: #DCDCDC"
|colspan="3" align=center |Final

|-style="background-color: #DCDCDC"
|colspan="3" align=center |Third place match

|}

Europe (UEFA)

Groupe 1 	Groupe 2 	Groupe 3
Classement Rang 	Équipe 	Pts 	J 	G 	N 	P 	Bp 	Bc 	Diff
1 	Slovénie 	9 	3 	3 	0 	0 	19 	1 	+18
2 	Yougoslavie 	6 	3 	2 	0 	1 	13 	9 	+4
3 	Géorgie 	3 	3 	1 	0 	2 	9 	16 	-7
4 	Moldavie 	0 	3 	0 	0 	3 	9 	24 	-15

    05.11.03 : Yougoslavie 6-3 (2-2) Géorgie
    05.11.03 : Slovénie 12-0 (5-0) Moldavie
    06.11.03 : Moldavie 4-6 (1-5) Yougoslavie
    06.11.03 : Slovénie 5-0 (2-0) Géorgie
    08.11.03 : Géorgie 6-5 (1-3) Moldavie
    08.11.03 : Yougoslavie 1-2 (1-2) Slovénie

	
Classement Rang 	Équipe 	Pts 	J 	G 	N 	P 	Bp 	Bc 	Diff
1 	Italie 	9 	3 	3 	0 	0 	22 	0 	+22
2 	Belgique 	6 	3 	2 	0 	1 	7 	5 	+2
3 	Finlande 	3 	3 	1 	0 	2 	4 	18 	-14
4 	France 	0 	3 	0 	0 	3 	4 	14 	-10

    07.11.03 : Italie 8-0 (2-0) France
    07.11.03 : Belgique 4-1 (1-1) Finlande
    08.11.03 : France 2-3 (1-2) Belgique
    08.11.03 : Italie 12-0 (4-0) Finlande
    10.11.03 : Finlande 3-2 (1-0) France
    10.11.03 : Belgique 0-2 (0-0) Italie

	
Classement Rang 	Équipe 	Pts 	J 	G 	N 	P 	Bp 	Bc 	Diff
1 	Bosnie-Herzégovine 	6 	2 	2 	0 	0 	5 	2 	+3
2 	Russie 	3 	2 	1 	0 	1 	8 	7 	+1
3 	Macédoine du Nord 	0 	2 	0 	0 	2 	4 	8 	-4

    05.11.03 : Russie 6-4 (2-3) Macédoine du Nord
    06.11.03 : Bosnie-Herzégovine 3-2 (0-2) Russie
    07.11.03 : Macédoine du Nord 0-2 (0-1) Bosnie-Herzégovine

Groupe 4 	Groupe 5 	Groupe 6
Classement Rang 	Équipe 	Pts 	J 	G 	N 	P 	Bp 	Bc 	Diff
1 	Ukraine 	6 	2 	2 	0 	0 	9 	2 	+7
2 	Kazakhstan 	3 	2 	1 	0 	1 	5 	4 	+1
3 	Andorre 	0 	2 	0 	0 	2 	2 	10 	-8

    04.11.03 : Kazakhstan 1-3 (1-0) Ukraine
    05.11.03 : Andorre 1-4 (1-2) Kazakhstan
    06.11.03 : Ukraine 6-1 (2-0) Andorre

	
Classement Rang 	Équipe 	Pts 	J 	G 	N 	P 	Bp 	Bc 	Diff
1 	Biélorussie 	6 	2 	2 	0 	0 	9 	4 	+5
2 	Lituanie 	1 	2 	0 	1 	1 	8 	10 	-2
3 	Pays-Bas 	1 	2 	0 	1 	1 	6 	9 	-3

    01.11.03 : Pays-Bas 5-5 (3-3) Lituanie
    02.11.03 : Biélorussie 4-1 (2-1) Pays-Bas
    03.11.03 : Lituanie 3-5 (1-0) Biélorussie

	
Classement Rang 	Équipe 	Pts 	J 	G 	N 	P 	Bp 	Bc 	Diff
1 	Portugal 	6 	2 	2 	0 	0 	26 	7 	+19
2 	Grèce 	3 	2 	1 	0 	1 	14 	12 	+2
3 	Albanie 	0 	2 	0 	0 	2 	10 	31 	-21

    06.11.03 : Grèce 1-8 (0-3) Portugal
    07.11.03 : Albanie 4-13 (3-8) Grèce
    08.11.03 : Portugal 18-6 (6-3) Albanie

Groupe 7 	Groupe 8 	Groupe 9
Classement Rang 	Équipe 	Pts 	J 	G 	N 	P 	Bp 	Bc 	Diff
1 	Pologne 	6 	2 	2 	0 	0 	19 	1 	+18
2 	Azerbaïdjan 	1 	2 	0 	1 	1 	5 	10 	-5
3 	Chypre 	1 	2 	0 	1 	1 	4 	17 	-13

    05.11.03 : Pologne 6-1 (3-0) Azerbaïdjan
    06.11.03 : Chypre 0-13 (0-7) Pologne
    07.11.03 : Azerbaïdjan 4-4 (1-3) Chypre

	
Classement Rang 	Équipe 	Pts 	J 	G 	N 	P 	Bp 	Bc 	Diff
1 	Hongrie 	6 	2 	2 	0 	0 	12 	7 	+5
2 	Croatie 	3 	2 	1 	0 	1 	14 	9 	+5
3 	Arménie 	0 	2 	0 	0 	2 	4 	14 	-10

    06.11.03 : Arménie 2-9 (2-4) Croatie
    07.11.03 : Hongrie 5-2 (2-1) Arménie
    08.11.03 : Croatie 5-7 (2-2) Hungary

	
Classement Rang 	Équipe 	Pts 	J 	G 	N 	P 	Bp 	Bc 	Diff
1 	Tchéquie 	6 	2 	2 	0 	0 	10 	5 	+5
2 	Israël 	3 	2 	1 	0 	1 	7 	6 	+1
3 	Roumanie 	0 	2 	0 	0 	2 	4 	10 	-6

    04.11.03 : Tchéquie 5-3 (4-0) Roumanie
    05.11.03 : Roumanie 1-5 (1-3) Israël
    06.11.03 : Israël 2-5 (1-1) Tchéquie

Groupe 10 	Barrages
Classement Rang 	Équipe 	Pts 	J 	G 	N 	P 	Bp 	Bc 	Diff
1 	Espagne 	6 	2 	2 	0 	0 	8 	3 	+5
2 	Lettonie 	1 	2 	0 	1 	1 	3 	5 	-2
3 	Slovaquie 	1 	2 	0 	1 	1 	4 	7 	-3

    07.11.03 : Espagne 3-1 (2-0) Lettonie
    08.11.03 : Slovaquie 2-5 (1-2) Espagne
    09.11.03 : Lettonie 2-2 (1-0) Slovaquie

	

    10.12.03 : Pologne 2-7 (0-4) Portugal
    17.12.03 : Portugal 7-2 (2-2) Pologne

    10.12.03 : Biélorussie 0-4 (0-1) Ukraine
    17.12.03 : Ukraine 3-2 (3-0) Biélorussie

	

    10.12.03 : Bosnie-Herzégovine 5-7 (2-3) Tchéquie
    17.12.03 : Tchéquie 4-4 (2-2) Bosnie-Herzégovine

    10.12.03 : Slovénie 1-4 (1-2) Espagne
    17.12.03 : Espagne 4-1 (3-0) Slovénie

	

    11.12.03 : Hongrie 0-4 (0-0) Italie
    17.12.03 : Italie 7-0 (1-0) Hongrie

Play-offs

|}

North, Central America and Caribbean (CONCACAF)

Semi-final

|}

Oceania (OFC)

Final positions

South America (CONMEBOL)

Final Round

See also

2004 FIFA Futsal World Championship
2004